The Phugwane River is a river in Limpopo Province, South Africa. It is a left hand tributary of the Shingwedzi River and the northernmost river of its catchment area, joining it in the middle of its basin. The Phugwane is a seasonal river whose riverbed is dry for prolonged periods.

Course
The Phugwane River drains the plain southeast of the Soutpansberg. Its sources are about 40 km to the ESE of Thohoyandou In the Mulamulele area  it flows eastwards across the lowveld and passes through three villages(Madonsi,Phugwani and Magona) before entering the area of the Kruger National Park.

See also
 Kruger National Park
 List of rivers of South Africa

References

External links

The Olifants River Basin, South Africa
The Olifants River System
The Limpopo Transboundary Programme

Olifants River (Limpopo)
Rivers of Limpopo